Oliver M. Darden (born July 28, 1944, in Aberdeen, Mississippi) is a retired American professional basketball player who played three seasons in the American Basketball Association (ABA).

A 6'7" forward/center from the University of Michigan. He was a 3-year starter along with Cazzie Russell, in what is claimed to be the "greatest basketball era at Michigan."  They won or shared the Big Ten title each year. In the sophomore year, they advanced in the NCAA tournament, eventually losing to Duke in the Final Four. The junior year they lost the NCAA final game 91–80 to UCLA. The senior year, they advanced to the regional final, losing to Kentucky and Adolph Rupp, a season in which Oliver was team captain.
   
Darden played in the American Basketball Association from 1967 to 1970 as a member of the Indiana Pacers, New York Nets, and Kentucky Colonels. He was drafted in 1966 with the second pick in the third round (22nd overall) by the NBA's Detroit Pistons, but never played for them.

Notes

1944 births
Living people
Amateur Athletic Union men's basketball players
American men's basketball players
Basketball players from Mississippi
Centers (basketball)
Detroit Pistons draft picks
Indiana Pacers players
Kentucky Colonels players
Michigan Wolverines men's basketball players
New York Nets players
People from Aberdeen, Mississippi
Power forwards (basketball)
Basketball players from Detroit
Western International High School alumni